In music rondellus is the formalized interchange of parts or voices according to a scheme, often used in English conducti and frequently in English motets of the late thirteenth and early fourteenth centuries, but never used for an entire piece . For example:

 A B C  D E F
 C A B  F D E
 B C A  E F D

where the italicized letters represent music with text and the other letters are melismatic .

See also
Round (music)

Sources

Further reading

 

Musical techniques